"Price to Play" is a song by American rock band Staind. It was the lead single from their fourth album, 14 Shades of Grey. "Price to Play" was released in advance and became a hit, charting high on both rock charts (number two on the Mainstream Rock Tracks and number six on the Modern Rock Tracks) and peaking within the top 100 of the Billboard Hot 100 at number 66. It was also the official theme song of WWE's Vengeance 2003 event.

Themes and composition
Frontman Aaron Lewis explained that the song was the last song written and recorded for the 14 Shades of Grey album, and the lyrics initially were influenced from his frustrations that the band was so close to done with finishing the album. He explained:

Similarly, Lewis stated the song was about the physical and mental toll of working in the music industry. While 14 Shades of Grey was less heavy than previous Staind albums at that time, "Price to Play" retained Staind's heavier and more aggressive  sound, with heavy guitars in the verses, soaring vocal harmonies, and melody/harmony guitars to complement the vocals.

Track listing
"Price to Play"
"Let It Out"
"Can't Believe" (Live Version from MTV Unplugged)

Charts

References

2003 singles
2003 songs
Staind songs
Elektra Records singles
Song recordings produced by Josh Abraham
Songs written by Aaron Lewis
Songs written by Mike Mushok